Tommaso Marconi (born 17 January 1982 in Rome) is an Italian diver.

Biography
In the 3 metre platform synchronized event he won the gold medal at the 2004 European Championships and the bronze medals at the European Championships in 2002 and 2006. He also competed at the 2004 Olympic Games and the 2008 Olympic Games.

He is a brother of divers Maria Marconi and Nicola Marconi.

References

External links
PADI Instructor Development Course

1982 births
Living people
Italian male divers
Divers at the 2004 Summer Olympics
Divers at the 2008 Summer Olympics
Olympic divers of Italy
Divers from Rome
Divers of Marina Militare
Divers of Fiamme Oro